John D. Bransford (December 14, 1943 - April 11, 2022) was an emeritus professor of education at the University of Washington College of Education in Seattle, Washington. He was the Founding Director of The Learning in Informal and Formal Environments (LIFE) Center, and a Centennial Professor and former director of the Learning Technology Center at Vanderbilt University. Dr. Bransford was a member Emeritus of the National Academy of Education and the 2001 recipient of the E. L. Thorndike Career Achievement Award. He died on April 11, 2022, at the age of 78.

References

1943 births
2022 deaths
University of Washington faculty
21st-century American psychologists
American educational theorists
Fellows of the Cognitive Science Society
Vanderbilt University faculty